The Fixer is a 2016 Romanian drama film directed by Adrian Sitaru. It was screened in the Contemporary World Cinema section at the 2016 Toronto International Film Festival. It was selected as the Romanian entry for the Best Foreign Language Film at the 90th Academy Awards, but it was not nominated.

Plot
A young reporter pursues the story of an underage prostitute under shock who is back from Paris in Transylvania. Though first driven by his ambition, he begins to question the moral boundaries of journalism.

Cast
 Sorin Cocis
 Tudor Istodor as Radu- Fixeur
 Mehdi Nebbou as Axel
 Diana Spatarescu as Anca
 Adrian Titieni
 Andreea Vasile
 Nicolas Wanczycki as Serge

See also
 List of submissions to the 90th Academy Awards for Best Foreign Language Film
 List of Romanian submissions for the Academy Award for Best Foreign Language Film

References

External links
 

2016 films
2016 drama films
Romanian drama films
2010s Romanian-language films
Films about journalists